Jackeline is a feminine given name. It is variant of Jacqueline, a French feminine form of Jacques which in turn comes from Jacob, a Hebrew name meaning "supplanter" or possibly "may God protect".

Notable people with this name
Jackeline Estevez, popular female singer in the Dominican Republic
Jackeline Olivier (born 1977), Brazilian actress
Jackeline Rentería (born 1986), female wrestler from Colombia
Jackeline Rodríguez (born 1972), the official representative of Venezuela to Miss Universe 1991

See also
Jackie (given name)
Jackline
Jacqueline (given name)

References